Sarcophagine (Sar) is a bicyclic cage-like metal chelator molecule derived from cyclam. Chemical formula of sarcophagine is 3,6,10,13,16,19-hexaazabicyclo(6,6,6)icosane and additional functional groups are often linked to this structure, such as in DiAmSar (1,8-diamino-Sar).  This and many related hexadentate clathrochelates are prepared by template reactions.

Sarcophagine derivatives are used, for example, as ligands in radiopharmaceuticals that require incorporating a radioactive metal cation into an organic and/or biological structure, such as an antibody.

References 

Chelating agents
Polyamines
Secondary amines
Hexadentate ligands